California gubernatorial recall election may refer to:

 2003 California gubernatorial recall election, in which Governor Gray Davis was recalled and Arnold Schwarzenegger elected in his place
 2021 California gubernatorial recall election, which unsuccessfully sought to recall and replace governor Gavin Newsom

See also
 1911 California Proposition 8, which introduced the recall law